Elvis: As Recorded at Madison Square Garden is a live album by American singer and musician Elvis Presley, released in June 1972 by RCA Records. It peaked at No. 11 on the Top 200 US Billboard albums chart on August 26, 1972. Recorded at the Madison Square Garden arena in New York City on Saturday June 10, 1972, the concert, and the subsequent album, were promoted as being Presley's first live concerts in the Big Apple since the 1950s.

The album was certified Gold on August 4, 1972, Platinum on May 20, 1988, double-Platinum on March 27, 1992, and triple-Platinum on July 15, 1999, by the RIAA. Along with Aloha from Hawaii: Via Satellite it ranked as the one of the best selling live albums of the 1970s.

Content
The entire set was issued on a single LP, and appeared at retail in swift fashion, about three weeks after the concert. Elvis' subsequent full-priced album would be another complete live concert recording -- with some song repetition -- this time in Honolulu: Aloha from Hawaii: Via Satellite.

The concert included on the 1972 New York album was the evening show on June 10th.  RCA Records also captured the afternoon performance, but except for "I Can't Stop Loving You," which appeared on the 1977 compilation, Welcome to My World, and "I'll Remember You" and "Reconsider Baby" on 1983's Elvis: A Legendary Performer Volume 3, the entire set remained unreleased until 1997's An Afternoon in the Garden.

Interestingly, 1970s Presley drummer Ronnie Tutt wrongly claimed in a 2009 interview for the BBC documentary Elvis in Vegas that Colonel Tom Parker, Presley's manager, sped up the mixes so that more tracks could be on the 1972 live album, increasing the publishing royalties.

Reissues
On November 13, 2012, RCA/Legacy re-released the live concert album on two vinyl discs in the same format as Aloha From Hawaii: Via Satellite and Elvis In Concert live concert albums. In 2013, RCA/Legacy, through HDTracks.com, released a high-resolution remastering of the concert in 24-bit/96 kHz.

Track listing

Personnel
James Burton – lead guitar
John Wilkinson – rhythm guitar
Ronnie Tutt – drums
Jerry Scheff – bass
Glen D. Hardin – piano
The Sweet Inspirations (Estelle Brown, Sylvia Shemwell, Myrna Smith) – background vocals
Kathy Westmoreland – background vocals
J.D. Sumner & The Stamps (Ed Enoch, Bill Baize, Richard Sterban, Donnie Sumner) – background vocals
Joe Guercio – conductor
The Joe Malin Orchestra
A&R/Producers: Harry Jenkins, Joan Deary, Felton Jarvis
Al Pachuki and Dick Baxter – recording engineers
Dick Baxter and Larry Schnapf – mastering and supervision

References

External links

 Elvis at Madison Square Garden

1972 live albums
Elvis Presley live albums
RCA Records live albums
Albums recorded at Madison Square Garden